Horbenko or Gorbenko is a Ukrainian surname. Notable people with the surname include:

 Anastasia Gorbenko (born 2003), Israeli swimmer
 Hennadiy Horbenko (born 1975), Ukrainian hurdler
 Ihor Horbenko, Ukrainian Paralympic athlete
 Leonid Gorbenko (1939–2010), Russian politician
 Sergiy Gorbenko (born 1985), Ukrainian basketball player
 Natalia Gorbenko (born 1970), Ukrainian figure skater
 Svitlana Horbenko (born 1985), Ukrainian Paralympic athlete

See also
 
 

Ukrainian-language surnames